El laberinto may refer to:

El laberinto (novel)
El laberinto (TV series)

See also

Laberinto, a music album
Labyrinth, an elaborate maze in Greek mythology